Simon Langton may refer to:
Simon Langton (priest)
Simon Langton (television director)

See also
 Simon Langton Grammar School for Boys
 Simon Langton Girls' Grammar School